Boyz N Girlz United, also known for Boyz n Girlz, was an American pop group consisting of members (two male, two female) Robbie Carrico (born November 13, 1981), Daniel Dix (born May 11, 1980), Rina Mayo (born April 25, 1981) and Criss Ruiz (born April 15, 1979). The group was signed to Johnny Wright's record label, Wire Records in 1999.

Overview
Boyz N Girlz United had a minor hit in 2000 with "Messed Around", a single that was written by former *NSYNC member JC Chasez. The single peaked at #82 on the UK Singles Chart. They also released their self-titled full-length album that same year choreographed by Keith Junior. From 1999 to 2001, they opened for Britney Spears' "Baby One More Time" U.S. tour and "Oops I Did It Again" European tour, N'Sync's "No Strings Attached" U.S. tour, and were also part of the All That Music and More Festival. The same year, they co-headlined the Generation WB Concert at the Wichita River Festival in Wichita, Kansas, along with Irish band Mytown (now The Script). However, by the end of the year, the group disbanded. Carrico was also a member of the short-lived boy band trio, B-Factor in 2001.

Former member Robbie Carrico auditioned for season 7 of American Idol and was able to make it to the top 24. He was eliminated in the top 20 after just two weeks. During his time in the competition, Simon Cowell questioned Carrico's authenticity as a rock singer. Responding to the comments, Carrico said that both his passion for rock n' roll, and his hair, are completely real. He said that claims he was wearing a wig during the competition were ridiculous.

Discography

Albums
Boyz-N-Girlz United (released June 20, 2000)

Singles
"Messed Around" (June 21, 2000)
"That's What You Get" (1999)

References

External links 
Album review
Hip Online Biography
Boyz-N-Girlz United-Starz of the Millennium! (fansite)

American pop music groups
Musical groups established in 1999
Musical groups disestablished in 2001
Musical quartets
1999 establishments in the United States